The third season of The Kelly Clarkson Show began airing on September 13, 2021.

Episodes

References

External links
 

3
2021 American television seasons
2022 American television seasons